Baccharis bigelovii is a North American species of shrubs in the family Asteraceae known by the common name Bigelow's false willow . It is found in the Chihuahuan Desert and nearby regions of the United States and Mexico, in the States of Chihuahua, Durango, Sonora, Arizona, New Mexico, and Texas.

Baccharis bigelovii is a shrub up to 100 cm (40 inches) tall, branching from the base. It produces many small flower heads. The plant grows on rocky ground in coniferous forests.

References

External links
Jepson Manual Treatment

bigelovii
Plants described in 1859
Flora of the South-Central United States
Flora of the Southwestern United States
Flora of Northwestern Mexico
Flora of Northeastern Mexico
Flora without expected TNC conservation status